In molecular biology, the chitinase A N-terminal domain is found at the N-terminus of a number of bacterial chitinases and similar viral proteins. It is organised into a fibronectin III module domain-like fold, comprising only beta strands. Its function is not known, but it may be involved in interaction with the enzyme substrate, chitin. It is separated by a hinge region from the catalytic domain; this hinge region is probably mobile, allowing the N-terminal domain to have different relative positions in solution.

References

Protein domains